The Opéra flamand was a Flemish language opera and theatre stage in Brussels between 1772 and 1776. It was housed in the La Monnaie theatre building in Brussels. Despite its name, it performed both theatre as well as opera.

The opera theatre was established on the initiative of Ignaz Vitzthumb, who was engaged as the manager and director of the French language opera theatre La Monnaie in Brussels. In this period, Brussels was one of the leading theatre culture centers of Europe, but all professional theatre was performed in the French language. The Flemish theatre was therefore an innovation of its time. It was a success, but the initiative did not last after Ignaz Vitzthumb left the post as manager.

References
 Bram Van Oostveldt:  The Theatre de la Monnaie and Theatre Life in the 18th Century Austrian ... ... 

Theatres in Brussels
18th century in Brussels
1772 in music
 
1772 establishments in the Holy Roman Empire